NPL can refer to:

Sport
 Nepal Premier League, a professional cricket league
 National Pool League, a defunct American pool league

Football
 Namibia Premier League, the defunct top tier of football in Namibia
 National Premier League, the top tier of football in Jamaica
 National Premier Leagues, the second tier of football in Australia
 Nigerian Premier League, the top tier of football in Nigeria
 Northern Premier League, at the seventh and eighth tier of football in England
 Northern Premier League (Tasmania), a third tier football league in Australia covering northern Tasmania
 Norwegian Premier League, the top tier of football in Norway

Computing
 Netscape Public License, a free software license
 New programming language, the original name of PL/I by IBM in 1964
 Nonprocedural language, by T.D. Truitt et al. in 1980
 NPL programming language, a functional programming language by Rod Burstall and John Darlington in 1977
 NORD Programming Language, an internal systems language used at Norsk Data
 NPL neural parallel language, open source programming language by Li Xizhi in 2005, used in ParaEngine
 NPL network, a computer network from 1967 until 1986, a precursor to the world wide web

Organizations
 National Puzzlers' League, the oldest puzzlers' organization in the world
 Non-Partisan League, an American socialist political organization
 National Physical Laboratory (United Kingdom)
 National Physical Laboratory of India
 New Paradise Laboratories, an experimental theater ensemble in Pennsylvania, USA

Places
 Nepal (ISO 3166-1 alpha-3 code)
 New Plymouth Airport (IATA code), New Zealand

Other uses
 Nuclear pumped laser, a laser pumped with the energy of fission fragments
 Nauru Pacific Line, the national shipping line of the Republic of Nauru
 Non-Patent Literature, used before the United States Patent and Trademark Office
 Non-performing loan, a loan close to, or in default
 National Priorities List, an EPA list of hazardous waste sites in the United States